Double-stranded RNA-specific editase B2 is an enzyme that in humans is encoded by the ADARB2 gene.

Function 

RNA-editing deaminase-2 (RED2, or ADARB2) is a member of the double-stranded RNA (dsRNA) adenosine deaminase family of RNA-editing enzymes. Adenosine deamination of pre-mRNA results in a change in the amino acid sequence of the gene product, which differs from that predicted by the genomic DNA sequence. Other members of this family include DRADA (ADAR) and RED1 (ADARB1).

Unlike ADAR1 and ADAR2, ADAR3 has demonstrated no editing ability in vitro. It has been shown to suppress 5-HT2C RNA editing in vitro through a yet unknown mechanism, and may thus work as a negative regulator.

References

External links

Further reading